Lemmy is free and open-source software for running self-hosted social news aggregation and discussion forums. The site has similar features to Reddit or Hacker News. Lemmy instances are run by a large number of individuals or corporations, each with their own content moderation policies. Users on individual instances submit posts with links, text, or pictures to user-created boards called “communities”. Communities are user created and local to each instance, however they may be posted to from other instances. Using a system of upvotes and downvotes users can influence what content appears at the top of the main feeds and of each community. Moderation is conducted by admins of each instance and moderators of specific communities. 

Lemmy is part of the Fediverse which allows users from other platforms to interact with posts created by Lemmy users. ActivityPub is the protocol used to allow Lemmy instances to operate as a federated social network and allows users to interact with compatible platforms including Mastodon and PeerTube.

Lemmy was created by the user Dessalines on GitHub and licensed under the Affero General Public License. It is crowdfunded by individual donations and also receives funding through NLnet's NGI0 Discovery Fund.

Overview 
Lemmy comprises user-generated content and discussions about the content in an internet forum. According to Lemmy, all 61 instances of Lemmy have a collective 1.2 thousand monthly active users. The "lemmyverse" is broken up into instances, which can be hosted by anyone, and further subdivided into communities. The most popular instances are lemmy.ml and lemmygrad.ml, each with approximately 320 monthly active users. 

Registering an account on any particular instance is free and may require an email address or approval by the admin of the instance. Registering an account allows you to create and post to communities. Accounts on ActivityPub-compatible software are able to interact with Lemmy posts but may not be able to post to communities directly. 

Communities are user-created forums for discussions. They are an integral part of Lemmy, as you must post your link, image or discussion to a specific community. Community names begin with c/ in the URL and are uniquely mentionable using this format: !community@instance.

Client apps for mobile devices include Jerboa and Lemmur for Android, and Remmel for iOS.

References 

Fediverse
Free and open-source software
Free software
Web applications